Varena is a frazione of the comune of Ville di Fiemme in Trentino in the northern Italian region Trentino-Alto Adige/Südtirol, about  northeast of Trento. It was merged with the other former municipalities of Carano and Daiano on 1 January 2020.

 

Cities and towns in Trentino-Alto Adige/Südtirol